Party Tricks was an Australian television political drama/comedy series starring Asher Keddie and Rodger Corser. It premiered on Network Ten on 6 October 2014 at 8:30pm.

On 3 October 2014 along with Offspring, John Edwards confirmed that Party Tricks would not return for a second series in 2015, due to Ten's production division running out of money.

Plot 
Kate Ballard (Asher Keddie) is facing her first re-election as State Premier. Committed and rigorous, her victory seems assured until the opposition announce a shocking new candidate: David McLeod (Rodger Corser), a popular media personality, and a man Kate had a secret, tumultuous affair with several years ago. To the world at large, David and Kate present as compelling, evenly-matched adversaries but a paranoid Kate fears that their complicated history is a trump card waiting to be played. Told in six parts, building to an election-night finale, this is a cat-and-mouse game, played out on a grand scale.

Conception 
On 26 July 2013, Network Ten announced a new drama project from Endemol Australia named Party Tricks, a six-part drama series by the producers of Offspring, Puberty Blues, The Secret Life of Us and Tangle; John Edwards and Imogen Banks.

Producer, Imogen Banks stated, "Politics, power and sex – what better elements for a big, juicy story? I cannot wait to make it. We're grateful to the country's politicians for living a reality that is far stranger than anything we could dream up. But it's our enormous pleasure to try."

Production 
Ten's head of drama, Rick Maier stated, "Imogen Banks and John Edwards have brought together the best of the best for this exciting new series, while Michael Lucas has created the perfect star vehicle for Asher and Rodger."

Filming for the first season began on 5 May 2014 and wrapped on 27 June 2014.

The six-part series produced by Imogen Banks and John Edwards for Endemol Australia and Network Ten with the assistance of Screen Australia and Film Victoria. It is created by Michael Lucas.

Cast 
 Asher Keddie as Kate Ballard, Labor Premier of Victoria and Member of Parliament for Richmond.  Former Minister for Planning, Education, and Deputy Premier.  Succeeded Rob Hutchens as Premier a year and a half prior to the start of the series.
 Rodger Corser as David McLeod, Victorian Liberal Party Leader, Liberal Candidate for Premier, and Candidate for Mount Waverley.  Succeeded Neil Thorby as Leader of the Liberals in Victoria.  Ultimately succeeds Ballard as Premier.
 Adam Zwar as Trevor Bailey, Deputy Leader of the Victorian Liberal Party and Interim Opposition Leader
 Angus Sampson as Wayne Duffy, Press Secretary and Spin Doctor to the Premier
 Colin Moody as Geoff Ballard, the Premier's Husband
 Kaiya Jones as Matilda McLeod, McLeod's Daughter
 Oliver Ackland as Tom Worland, State Political Reporter and Ollie's boyfriend
 Doris Younane as Paula Doumani, Deputy Premier and Minister for Transport
 Charlie Garber as Oliver Ollie Parkham, the Premier's Speechwriter
 Ash Ricardo as Charlotte Wynn, Campaign Director for McLeod
 Ryan Powell as Shaggy Mycology
 Michala Banas as Tanya Keegan
 Thomas Campbell as Jonathan
 Neil Melville as Duncan Guthrie, former President of the Victorian Liberal Party
 Gareth Yuen as Lucas Fry, Liberal Party Volunteer
 Georgia Bolton as Kez, Kate's Security Detail
 Catherine Glavicic as Ann-Marie Dwyer

Episodes

Season 1 (2014)

Ratings 

Figures are OzTAM Data for the 5 City Metro areas.
Overnight – Live broadcast and recordings viewed the same night.
Consolidated – Live broadcast and recordings viewed within the following seven days.

Awards and nominations

References

Network 10 original programming
Australian drama television series
2014 Australian television series debuts
2014 Australian television series endings
Television shows set in Victoria (Australia)
English-language television shows
Australian political drama television series
Television series by Endemol